La Hija del viejito guardafaro is a 1939  Argentine film directed by Julio Irigoyen. The film premiered in Buenos Aires and starred Enrique del Cerro.

Cast
Enrique del Cerro
Laura Nelson
Yaya Palau
Arturo Sanchez
Warly Ceriani

External links

1939 films
1930s Spanish-language films
Argentine black-and-white films
Films directed by Julio Irigoyen
1930s Argentine films